William Fraser (1784 – 22 March 1835) was a British India civil servant who was an Agent to the Governor General of India and Commissioner of the Delhi Territory during the reign of the last Mughal Emperor, Bahadur Shah Zafar. He was a brother of James Baillie Fraser.

He was assassinated in Delhi in 1835.

Biography
The village of Rania, now in Haryana, "was home to Amiban, main mistress to William Fraser, and his two Anglo-Indian sons and daughter."

His bungalow, a low domed structure in lemon yellow colour was situated near Kashmere Gate area, behind St. James Church.

He was killed near his home on  22 March 1835, by Kureem Khan, an assassin hired by Shamsuddin Ahmed Khan, Nawab of Loharu and Ferozepur Jhirka, who shot him with a carbine and Fraser died instantly. The assassination was done due to Shamsuddin being aggrieved at Fraser's espousal of his brother's claims in a property dispute. Nawab Shamsuddin Ahmed Khan, the ruler of Loharu and Ferozepur Jhirka and father of noted Mughal poet, Daagh Dehlvi was hanged in connection with the murder. His death is mentioned in the Delhi Book (1844) of Sir Thomas Metcalfe, a subsequent agent at the Mughal imperial court.

He was first buried at a local burial ground, thereafter reburied at the St. James' Church, Delhi by Colonel James Skinner, who built the church in 1836.
Today William Fraser's bungalow houses the Office of Chief Engineer Northern Railways (Construction) and has restricted entry. William Dalrymple mentions visiting the bungalow in his 1994 book City of Djinns.

Fraser Album

He was among the British officers who were greatly influenced by the Mughal culture. He was a great patron of arts, and was a big admirer of Mughal poet, Ghalib. He also commissioned famed art work called as the Fraser Album. It consisted of works by renowned artists of Mughal era. The artwork covered the life in Mughal era during the time.

Gallery

See also
 List of British Residents or Political Agents in Delhi, 1803–57

References

External links

British East India Company civil servants
1784 births
1835 deaths
British people in colonial India
History of Delhi
Deaths by firearm in India
People murdered in India